Lac des Vieilles Forges is a lake at Renwez in Ardennes, France. The reservoir has a surface area of 1.4 km². It is located at an elevation of 340 m. It is fed and drained by the river Faux, a tributary of the Meuse.

See also
 

Vieilles Forges
Vieilles Forges
Landforms of Ardennes (department)
Grand Est region articles needing translation from French Wikipedia
RVieilles Forges